Sauria Paharia may refer to:
Sauria Paharia people, a tribal people of Jharkhand in India
Sauria Paharia language, a variant of the Malto language spoken by the Sauria Paharia people